WKSG (98.3 MHz) is an FM radio station broadcasting and licensed to Garrison, Kentucky, United States; the station is currently owned by Fowler Media Partners, LLC and is being operated by Strong Tower Christian Media ahead of a sale to the company. and serves Portsmouth, OH and the OH-KY-WV Tri-State area. The station's transmitter tower is located in Greenup County near the community of Garrison and the Lewis County line.

History
Originally licensed in 1998 as WOKE and branded as Joy FM playing southern gospel music, the station subsequently shifted to contemporary Christian music branded as Ignite FM, before flipping to a secular contemporary hit radio format branded as Pulse 98.3. In 2018, the station was sold to Fowler Media Partners.

In March 2018, the station stunted as "Trump 98.3" for a week, promising to "Make Radio Great Again". This emulated a similar stunt by related station WVWF, with a playlist of songs referencing money, patriotism, and walls. On March 8, 2018, WOKE flipped to a "Country Superstars" format and changed its call letters to WPAY-FM. The call sign was acquired from the local K-Love station now known as WPYK, which operated as a country station under the WPAY-FM call letters from 1966 until 2011 and again briefly identifying as WPAY-FM in 2017–2018 after assuming the K-Love format. Sean King of WOKE became the morning host on the new WPAY-FM. 

The station changed its call sign to WFHT on July 23, 2021, and to WZGR on October 25, 2021.

On November 29, 2021, WZGR changed its format from classic country to southern gospel, branded as "Grace-FM 98.3".

On January 17, 2022, WZGR changed its format from southern gospel to hot adult contemporary, branded as "98.3 Hot-FM" and changed its call sign back to WFHT on January 26, then changed them again to WITO on March 6. The WITO call letters were then swapped with the former WIRO in Ironton, Ohio, on May 10.

Fowler Media Partners announced the sale of WIRO, which by then had shifted to contemporary hit radio, to Strong Tower Christian Media of Xenia, Ohio, with the intention of returning the station to a southern gospel format using an LMA even before the completion of the sale, late in 2022. The station changed its call sign to WKSG on October 20, 2022; on November 23, the station began stunting with Christmas music as "98.3 The Rock" as Strong Tower began operation of the station by local marketing agreement. On December 26, 2022 the station launched a full time Southern Gospel Hits format.

References

External links

Radio stations established in 1998
1998 establishments in Kentucky
Southern Gospel radio stations in the United States
KSG